The Renault Clio V6 Renault Sport is a rear mid-engine, rear-wheel-drive layout sport compact based on the Renault Clio launched in 2001. Designed by French automaker Renault the Phase 1 models were built by Tom Walkinshaw Racing (TWR) in Uddevalla, Sweden and Phase 2 were designed and hand built by Renault Sport in Dieppe, France. Both variants were developed by TWR. The mid-engined, wide-body concept of the Clio V6 was very reminiscent of the 1980s Renault 5 Turbo. Both road going models were low volume production making them very rare cars. Alongside the road car, a circuit only version was produced, known as the Clio V6 Trophy.

Clio V6 Trophy (1999–2003)

The Trophy is a competition car built in Renaultsports' Dieppe facility. Built as a single make series competition car to promote the new Clio 2 range, the Clio V6 Trophy series replaced the Renaultsport Spider Trophy, which finished in 1998. 
Starting with the shell of a front wheel drive standard Clio, the cars were completely reworked to house a 3–litre V6 engine (derived from the PSA group engine used in the Renault Laguna).
The race cars inspired the construction of a road going car, which resulted in the Clio V6 released in 2001. Whilst it bears a striking resemblance to the road cars, it was completely different, only sharing very minor body parts.

There were 159 cars built between 1999 and 2003.

Clio V6 Phase 1 (2001–2003)
The Clio V6 was based on the Clio Mk II, though it shares very few parts with that car.
In order to accommodate the radical change from front-engine, front-wheel drive hatchback to mid-engine, rear-wheel drive two-seater quasi-coupé, the car had to be extensively reworked structurally, leading to the Phase 1 version being some  heavier than the sportiest "regular" Clio, the 172 Cup. The raw sound and weight of the V6 engine just behind the driver and RWD made the driving experience very different from the normal front engined front wheel drive car.

There were 1,555 production cars built in total between 2001 and 2002.

Clio V6 Phase 2 (2003–2005)

Though based on a utilitarian hatchback, the Clio V6 is not a practical family car. The loss of the back seats and most of the boot space, due to the engine placement, results in a severe restriction in luggage space – there is only a small space in the front where the engine used to be, suitable for a holdall or week-end groceries, a small netted area behind the seats plus a small stash area under the tailgate. The enhanced steering makes tight manoeuvring a little challenging, the turning circle is  – around three car lengths – turning what might normally be a three-point turn into a five-point turn. The Clio V6 Phase 2 gained even more weight, but offset it with an additional 25 horsepower.

Standard equipment includes rain sensing windscreen wipers, automatic headlights, air conditioning, and six speakers and CD changer. The Phase 2 Clio V6 retailed for £27,125 in the United Kingdom, until it was withdrawn from sale in 2005 coinciding with a facelift for the Clio range. The long-term reviews in Evo magazine were enthusiastic, claiming "It's a modern classic" for the Phase 2 version. Jeremy Clarkson once referred to the Clio V6 as one of his top 10 cars.

There were 1,309 production cars built in total between 2003 and 2005.

Engines

References

External links
 Renault Sport official website
 v6Clio.net Clio V6 Owners' Club

Clio V6
Rear mid-engine, rear-wheel-drive vehicles
Cars introduced in 2001
Cars discontinued in 2005
Renault Clio V6 Renault Sport

de:Renault Clio#Clio Renault Sport V6 24V